The North West Senior Cup or North West Cup is a senior football competition in Northern Ireland run by the North West of Ireland Football Association. Senior and intermediate teams from the North West FA's jurisdiction (which covers County Londonderry and parts of County Tyrone), are entitled to enter. It originated as the County Londonderry F.A. Cup in 1886–87 but became the North West Cup in 1892.

Finals

Performance by club

‡ Including 5 as St Columb's Hall Celtic.

See also
County Antrim Shield
Mid-Ulster Cup
Craig Memorial Cup

Sources
Northern Ireland Soccer Yearbook 2007/2008 (Ed. Malcolm Brodie)
Ulster Football & Cycle Annual 1909/10
George Glass, The Men from Scroggy.

References

5